Lansdown Crescent or Lansdowne Crescent may refer to:

 Lansdown Crescent, Bath, UK
 Lansdown Crescent, Cheltenham, UK
 Lansdowne Crescent, Leamington Spa, UK
 Lansdowne Crescent, London, UK

See also 
 Lansdowne (disambiguation)